José Luis Díaz Vázquez (born March 31, 1957 in Maracaibo, Venezuela) is a Spanish retired basketball player. He played 18 times with the Spain national team.

Clubs
1978-80: CB Tempus
1980-83: Real Madrid
1983-89: CB Zaragoza
1989-93: Valencia BC

Awards
Intercontinental Cup (1): 1981
Liga Nacional (1): 1981-82
Copa del Rey (1): 1983-84

References
 ACB profile

1957 births
Living people
CB Zaragoza players
Liga ACB players
Point guards
Real Madrid Baloncesto players
Spanish men's basketball players
Sportspeople from Maracaibo
Valencia Basket players
Venezuelan expatriate basketball people in Spain
Venezuelan men's basketball players